Events from the year 1504 in India.

Events
 22 April – 6th Portuguese India Armada (Albergaria, 1504) sets sail for India, and arrives late August/Early September
 March – July – Battle of Cochin (1504)
 Battle of Pandarane
 Tristão da Cunha becomes nominal governor of Portuguese India (but never took office)

Births
 31 March, Guru Angad the second of the Sikh Gurus is born in Sarae Naga in Muktsar (dies  1552) 
 Ranabai,  warrior and a Hindu mystical poet (dies 1570)

Deaths
 Qasim Barid I, prime-minister of the Bahmani sultanate and the founder of the Bidar Sultanate dies (born 1489)

References

See also 
 Timeline of Indian history